Nagra is a town and a municipal board in Ballia district in the Indian state of Uttar Pradesh So the city was named 'Nagra'. It has an important market for the nearby villages. Lounglatta is the famous sweet of Nagra. Its Dushehara fair is famous in Ballia district. Nagra has top schools of district. Nagra has second largest Durga Puja celebration in Uttar Pradesh after Ram Nagar, Varanasi, Kali Mandir, Hanuman Mandir, Masjid, etc. are beautiful places of Nagra. It has a busy Sabzi Mandi Nagra, Fish Market, Chicken Market, Mutton Market. ,etc.

Demography
Nagra village has total population of 14,405 per 2011 census. as nagra will announce town area in 2020. So population is beyond 20000 approx.

References

Cities and towns in Ballia district
Villages in Ballia district